Un-Break My Heart: The Remix Collection is the first remix album by American R&B singer Toni Braxton, released on April 12, 2005, by Sony BMG Music Entertainment in association with La Face Records and Legacy Recordings, while on iTunes, it was released a month later, on March 31, 2005. It takes its name from Braxton's signature ballad, "Un-Break My Heart".

Un-Break My Heart: The Remix Collection features ten club mixes by Hex Hector, David Morales, Frankie Knuckles, Peter Rauhofer and Junior Vasquez among others, with the track list consisting of songs from her albums Secrets, The Heat, and More Than a Woman. It is formatted as a continuous club mix. The compilation received a favorable review from Allmusic, which praised it for being a welcome change of pace and praised Hex Hector's remixes.

Background and content 
"Un-Break My Heart: The Remix Collection" is Braxton's first remix album, being released on April 12, 2005, in the United States by Sony BMG Music Entertainment. It was released on March 31, 2005, on iTunes. The album includes remixes only from "Secrets" (1996) and "The Heat" (2000).

Hex Hector remixed the songs "Spanish Guitar", "Maybe" and "Hit the Freeway", while Frankie Knuckles provided remixes for "I Don't Want To" and "Un-Break My Heart". David Morales remixed "You're Makin' Me High", while Junior Vasquez providing a remix for "He Wasn't Man Enough".

Critical reception 

Andy Kellman of AllMusic gave the album 3 out of 5 stars, writing that, "'Un-Break My Heart: The Remix Collection' is a nice change of pace from the typical patched-together cash-in compilation of remixes," praising Hex Hector for "allowing enough room for the bulk of each track to play, rather than showing off quick-wristed skills that would likely knock the wind out of the selections." Kellman picked "the 'HQ2' mix of 'Hit the Freeway,' Frankie Knuckles mix of 'Un-Break My Heart,' and Peter Rauhofer's mix of 'He Wasn't Man Enough' as the highlights."

Track listing

Personnel 
Audio Remixers: Joaquin "Joe" Claussell, Eddie Cumana, J-Dub, Hex Hector, Frankie Knuckles, David Morales, Mac Quayle, Peter Rauhofer, Beppe Savoni, Soul Solution.  
Photographer: Daniela Federici. 
Arrangers: Toni Braxton, Keith Crouch, David Foster, R. Kelly.

Charts
The album charted on the US Top Electronic Albums chart, peaking at number 20.

Release history

References 

2005 remix albums
Legacy Recordings remix albums
Sony Music remix albums
Toni Braxton compilation albums
Dance music compilation albums
House music compilation albums